Catoptria permutatellus is a species of moth of the family Crambidae. It is found in Europe. The imago can only be distinguished from Catoptria osthelderi by microscopic research of the genitalia.

The wingspan is 22–29 mm. The moth flies from May to August depending on the location.

The larvae feed on various mosses.

External links
 waarneming.nl 
 Lepidoptera of Belgium

Crambini
Moths of Europe
Moths described in 1848